Hunor Szőcs (born 24 March 1992 in Târgu Mureș) is a Romanian professional table tennis player who plays for the German club Werder Bremen.

He started playing Table Tennis in Târgu-Mureș, until he was 14 years old at which point he was transferred to Csm-Lps Bistrița, where he was a part of Olympic Center which was designed to train the boys national team. He became singles champion of Romania in 2012.

Szőcs has a younger sister, Bernadette, who is also a national Romanian table tennis player. They are of Hungarian descent.

References

1992 births
Living people
Sportspeople from Târgu Mureș
Romanian male table tennis players
Romanian sportspeople of Hungarian descent
Romanian expatriate sportspeople in Switzerland
Table tennis players at the 2019 European Games
European Games competitors for Romania
20th-century Romanian people
21st-century Romanian people